Quitman is a city in and the county seat of Brooks County, Georgia, United States. The population was 3,850 at the 2010 census.  The Quitman Historic District is listed on the National Register of Historic Places.

Quitman was a home of James Pierpont, author of the song "Jingle Bells" (1857), and uncle of American financier J.P. Morgan. Pierpont was organist for the First Presbyterian Church.

A local Quitman ordinance prohibits chickens from crossing the road.

It is called the "Camellia City", as the tree grows in profusion around the area.

History
Quitman was designated county seat of newly formed Brooks County in 1858. It was incorporated as a town in 1859 and as a city in 1904. As the county seat, it was the center of trading in the county, which was devoted to cotton plantations before and after the American Civil War. The community was named for John A. Quitman, a hero of the Mexican–American War.

Geography
U.S. Routes 84 and 221 pass through the center of the city.

Demographics

2020 census

As of the 2020 United States Census, there were 4,064 people, 1,476 households, and 836 families residing in the city.

2000 census
As of the census of 2000, there were 4,638 people, 1,707 households, and 1,131 families residing in the city. The racial makeup of the city was 30.98% White, 66.36% African American, 0.13% Native American, 0.37% Asian, 1.06% from other races, and 1.10% from two or more races. Hispanic or Latino of any race were 2.18% of the population.

There were 1,707 households, out of which 31.3% had children under the age of 18 living with them, 31.9% were married couples living together, 30.2% had a female householder with no husband present, and 33.7% were non-families. 30.4% of all households were made up of individuals, and 14.2% had someone living alone who was 65 years of age or older.  The average household size was 2.61 and the average family size was 3.26.

In the city, the population was spread out, with 30.1% under the age of 18, 8.8% from 18 to 24, 22.9% from 25 to 44, 20.3% from 45 to 64, and 17.9% who were 65 years of age or older.  The median age was 35 years. For every 100 females, there were 78.6 males.  For every 100 females age 18 and over, there were 68.6 males.

The median income for a household in the city was $20,924, and the median income for a family was $24,154. Males had a median income of $22,727 versus $17,391 for females. The per capita income for the city was $10,594.  About 31.2% of families and 34.2% of the population were below the poverty line, including 46.7% of those under age 18 and 20.9% of those age 65 or over.

Industry
The prevalent industries in Quitman are farming and automotive. Cass Burch Automotive Group is located in downtown Quitman, with both Dodge Chrysler Jeep & Ram and Chevrolet dealerships represented.

Climate
The climate in this area is characterized by hot, humid summers and generally mild to cool winters.  According to the Köppen Climate Classification system, Quitman has a humid subtropical climate, abbreviated "Cfa" on climate maps.

Education 
Schools for Quitman are Quitman Elementary School, Brooks County Middle School, and  Brooks County High School.

Media
Radio station WGOV-FM 96.7 is licensed to broadcast from Quitman. The Quitman Free Press, a weekly newspaper, is the official legal publication for Brooks County. It has been in operation since 1876.

Notable people

 Nellie Weldon Cocroft - ragtime composer, born in Quitman
 Edna Cain Daniel, writer, journalist, long-time publisher of the Quitman Free Press
 Dana A. Dorsey - Banker, realtor, business executive, and philanthropist. Child of freed slaves.
 Henry L. Reaves - politician, farmer, and cattleman
 James Lord Pierpont - songwriter of Jingle Bells, church organist, taught at the Quitman Academy. Uncle of J.P. Morgan.

References

External links

Cities in Georgia (U.S. state)
Cities in Brooks County, Georgia
County seats in Georgia (U.S. state)
Cities in the Valdosta metropolitan area